Pottsville is an unincorporated community in Graves County, Kentucky, United States.

References

Unincorporated communities in Graves County, Kentucky
Unincorporated communities in Kentucky